The Germany national badminton team represents Germany in international badminton team competitions. It is controlled by the German Badminton Association (German: Deutscher Badminton-Verband), the national organization for badminton in the nation. Germany have two bronze finishes at the Uber Cup, particularly in 2006 and 2008. The woman's team were also champions in the 2012 Women's Team Badminton Championships.

In the mixed team competition, the German team won gold in the 2013 European Mixed Team Badminton Championships after upsetting Denmark with a score of 3-0 in the final tie.

Participation in BWF competitions

Thomas Cup

Uber Cup

Sudirman Cup

Participation in European Team Badminton Championships

Men's Team

Women's Team

Mixed Team

Participation in Helvetia Cup 
The Helvetia Cup or European B Team Championships was a European mixed team championship in badminton. The first Helvetia Cup tournament took place in Zurich, Switzerland in 1962. The tournament took place every two years from 1971 until 2007, after which it was dissolved. Germany have only participated in the following years and have won every Helvetia Cup title they participated in.

Participation in European Junior Team Badminton Championships
Mixed Team

Current squad 
The following players were selected to represent Germany at the 2022 Thomas & Uber Cup.

Male players
Max Weißkirchen
Kai Schäfer
Samuel Hsiao
Matthias Kicklitz
Mark Lamsfuß
Marvin Seidel
Jan Colin Völker
Bjarne Geiss
Jones Ralfy Jansen
Daniel Hess

Female players
Yvonne Li
Ann-Kathrin Spöri
Florentine Schöffski
Linda Efler
Isabel Lohau
Annabella Jäger
Stine Küspert
Emma Moszczynski
Leona Michalski
Selin Hübsch

References

Badminton
National badminton teams
Badminton in Germany